The Business Tribune is a trade newspaper in Portland, Oregon, established in 2014 and published twice a week, on Tuesdays and Fridays. The Business Tribune website is updated daily and breaking news bulletins are posted on topics including business, development, legal news and public notices, mainly in the Portland metro area. It is locally-owned and readership reaches state-wide.

The Tribune publishes ads, bids and sub-bids to connect the construction, development, engineering and architecture industries on projects around Portland.

It runs columns from industry experts including Business For A Better Portland, the Westside Economic Alliance, the Portland Business Alliance, Business Oregon, the Associated General Contractors and more.

History 
The Business Tribune is part of Pamplin Media Group, which is locally owned by Robert B. Pamplin, Jr. PMG also includes several community newspapers and the radio stations KPAM and KKOV.

Started in 2014, the Business Tribune is published as an insert section in the Portland Tribune and other community newspapers by subscription on Tuesdays, including the Lake Oswego Review, the Beaverton Valley Times, the Hillsboro Tribune, the West Linn Tidings, the Tigard/Tualatin Times and the Sherwood Gazette. On Fridays, it is available in newspaper kiosks around downtown Portland and Salem, as well as in the Gresham Outlook, the Wilsonville Spokesman, the Woodburn Independent, the Newberg Graphic, the Forest Grove News-Times and the Canby Herald.  It is also mailed directly to trade organization and industry-specific businesses upon request.

The newspaper was published weekly, on Tuesdays, until January 2016, when a Friday edition was added.

References

External links 
Business Tribune website
The Business Tribune

2014 establishments in Oregon
Newspapers published in Portland, Oregon
Newspapers published by Pamplin Media Group
Publications established in 2014